Lindley Creek is a stream in  Dallas, Hickory and Polk counties the U.S. state of Missouri. It is a tributary of the Pomme de Terre River.

The stream flows generally north passing under Missouri Route 32 about two miles west of Buffalo. About four miles to the north the stream turn to the west and enters Polk County. The stream flows northwest and turns north as it passes under Missouri Route 64 just east of Mohawk Corner. The stream enters Hickory County and enters the waters of Pomme de Terre Lake.

Lindley Creek has the name of one Mr. Lindley, a pioneer who became stuck due to severe weather and had to winter in the area.

See also
List of rivers of Missouri

References

Rivers of Dallas County, Missouri
Rivers of Hickory County, Missouri
Rivers of Polk County, Missouri
Rivers of Missouri